Krkovo pri Karlovici is a small settlement north of Karlovica in the Municipality of Velike Lašče in central Slovenia. The area is part of the traditional region of Lower Carniola and is now included in the Central Slovenia Statistical Region.

Name
The name of the settlement was changed from Krkovo to Krkovo pri Karlovici in 1953.

References

External links

Krkovo pri Karlovici on Geopedia

Populated places in the Municipality of Velike Lašče